Tom Smith (born 28 May, 1992) is a British hairstylist, entrepreneur and trend forecaster based between London and Sydney.

Biography

Early life
Smith was born in 1992, in Maidstone, England, into a working-class family. At the age of 14, he began working in a local hair salon, before being directed by the salon owner, who had witnessed his creative potential, to interview for Vidal Sassoon's Sassoons Salon, where he joined their apprenticeship program in 2008.

Career
Between 2008 and 2011, Smith worked as an apprentice at Sassoon Salon in Mayfair, London. In 2011, he moved to Fitzrovia and began working at Billi Currie, a luxury hair salon in Marylebone. Currently, Smith is a creative director at Billi Currie. In 2014, he was brought on as part of the team to launch Olaplex to the United Kingdom market. Smith is on the artistic team of Olaplex as well as the brand ambassador of the company. In 2016, he was appointed International Creative Director at Evo, an Australian hair-care brand.

Smith is widely known for predicting viral and global hair trends. He is credited with creating hairstyles such as Bottleneck Bangs, Expensive Blonde, Mushroom Blonde and Curtain Cut. Smith has styled hair of prominent celebrities such as Louise Redknapp, Geri Halliwell and others. He has been featured in several publications including British Vogue, Harpers Bazaar, Tatler, Grazia, Stylist, Elle and Glamour. He has lectured at several hair conferences around the globe and regularly presents the latest haircare techniques. Smith has also served as a judge at various national and international consumer and magazine awards.

References

External links
Official website

British hairdressers

People from Maidstone
1992 births
Living people